The Republic of Vietnam Army Distinguished Service Order, Republic of Vietnam Air Force Distinguished Service Order and Republic of Vietnam Navy Distinguished Service Order was a military decoration of South Vietnam which
was awarded throughout the years of the Vietnam War. The decoration was bestowed for meritorious or heroic deeds related to wartime operations and was awarded for both combat and non-combat service.

There were two classes of the RVN Army/Air Force/Navy Distinguished Service Order, the first class being for officers and the second class for enlisted personnel. The first class of the order was differentiated by a blossom device centered on the medal and ribbon.

The RVN Army/Air Force/ Navy Distinguished Service Order was also provided to foreign militaries, and in the United States military the decoration was considered the equivalent of the Legion of Merit. For foreign officers, the 2nd class of the order was also provided to officers.

The decoration ranked immediately below the National Order of the Republic of Vietnam and the Republic of Vietnam Military Merit Medal. It was among the less commonly bestowed medals, in contrast to such decorations as the Republic of Vietnam Gallantry Cross and Republic of Vietnam Campaign Medal.

The last issuance of the Vietnam Distinguished Service Order was in 1974, before the Fall of Saigon.

See also
Orders, decorations, and medals of South Vietnam

External links
Military Orders, Decorations, and Medals of the Republic of Vietnam

Military awards and decorations of Vietnam